| boilerpressure=
| cylindercount=Two
| cylindersize=
| tractiveeffort=
| factorofadhesion = 7.65
| operator=St. Paul and Pacific Railroad, Saint Paul, Minneapolis and Manitoba Railway, Great Northern Railway
| operatorclass=1
| fleetnumbers=1
| firstrundate=June 1862
| retiredate=September 1897
| currentowner=Minnesota Historical Society, loaned to Lake Superior Railroad Museum
| disposition=static display at Lake Superior Railroad Museum
}}

The William Crooks is a 4-4-0 steam locomotive that was the first locomotive to operate in the State of Minnesota, beginning in 1861. It was named after William Crooks, the Chief Mechanical Engineer for the St. Paul and Pacific Railroad.   He served as a colonel and commander of the 6th Minnesota Volunteer Infantry Regiment during the American Civil War.  Crooks laid the initial  track between Minneapolis and St. Paul, and the William Crooks was the first locomotive to run on the line.

History

1861–1900 
Constructed in 1861 for the Minnesota and Pacific Railroad as their number 1, The William Crooks first provided service a year later, in 1862, for the St. Paul and Pacific Railroad (into which the M&P had been reorganized). After completion, the locomotive traveled by rail to La Crosse, Wisconsin, then the nearest rail point to St. Paul. From there, it was loaded onto a Mississippi River barge bound for St. Paul. The William Crooks carried its first train load of passengers on the same day. The trip began at 2:30 PM from St. Paul with the train and its passengers returning from their  trip to St. Anthony (now Minneapolis) at 6 PM. Though the governor of Minnesota, the founder of the railroad, and other dignitaries were the train's first passengers, the train moved into regular service four days later.

The locomotive was originally a wood-burner with a tender that held just two cords of wood.  Often the tender's wood was used before the train could reach a wood pile, forcing the crew to make use of the wooden right-of-way fences to keep the train moving. Later the locomotive was converted into a coal-burner. As built, the engine had a straight boiler (not tapered from a larger diameter at the firebox end to a smaller diameter at the smokebox end), had the balloon stack typical of wood burning engines, and three domes—the center of which was for sanding the rails to improve traction when needed.  As the engine aged and parts replaced, the engine's appearance changed.  The engine received a diamond stack for burning coal, its boiler replaced with a tapered design, and was reduced to a two dome configuration.

In 1868, a fire partially destroyed the William Crooks.  Albion B. Smith was tasked with restoring the locomotive and became the locomotive's engineer once it returned to service. He became a personal friend to James J. Hill through his works and service with the William Crooks.  The old locomotive had served almost 50 years and had eventually been assigned to runs in Montana and Washington.  The William Crooks was in passenger service until September 30, 1897, after which it was retired, and by the turn of the century was sitting decommissioned in a corner of the Great Northern yard in St. Paul.  The locomotive was restored to operation for Hill's 70th birthday in 1908, as he had insisted when informed of its condition. Smith, who worked a regular schedule for the Great Northern Railway, would be reassigned to duty with the William Crooks for special events such as this and, later, the Alaska–Yukon–Pacific Exposition.   After he received word that the William Crooks was to be scrapped, it was Smith who spoke to Hill about it, with Hill declaring, "Not as long as I live".  After Hill's death in 1916, the Great Northern continued to exhibit the train at special events.  The railroad gave the engine a balloon stack similar in appearance to its original, but internally designed to be suitable for coal as well as wood.

1900–present 
In 1924, the locomotive went on an exhibition tour from Chicago to Seattle.  For this event, the railroad rebuilt the engine to further resemble its original form, restoring it to the original three-dome configuration, though it retained the tapered boiler. The William Crooks was displayed at the Baltimore and Ohio Railroad's "Fair of the Iron Horse" in 1927, then at the 1939 New York World's Fair, and finally at the Chicago Railroad Fair in 1948 as part of the "Wheels A-Rolling" pageant, traveling to and from all three events under its own power. Though the locomotive had been converted from burning wood to burning coal as fuel, its headlight remained lit by kerosene; this restricted the William Crooks''' travel to daylight hours only.

On the way to the 1939 World's Fair, the locomotive made a stop in Paterson, New Jersey, where it had been built 78 years before.  The old locomotive made many stops en route to New York City, drawing crowds everywhere it went. At that time it was the oldest locomotive operating under its own power.  Accompanying the William Crooks was John J. Maher, a retired Great Northern engineer.  Maher began his career with the railroad in 1881 as a fireman for the William Crooks; he became the locomotive's engineer in 1888. He indicated that there had been no breakdowns during the trip from St. Paul and speculated that the locomotive could probably travel at up to  without difficulty.

Maher, whose work as a fireman took place before the William Crooks was converted to burning coal, recalled that in the early days, part of a fireman's equipment was an axe, so wood could be chopped if the wood in the locomotive's tender ran out.  He said he often needed to go out and look for wood to keep the William Crooks moving. The locomotive was accompanied to the World's Fair by two 1880s vintage coaches which still had their original candle holders from the days when they were lit by candle light, and their original wood stoves for warmth.

Its cylinders, rods and bearings were all rebuilt at the Great Northern's Dale Street Shops in St. Paul in 1947-48 by machinist George A. Halvorsen as his last job before retirement.

The William Crooks was placed on display at the St. Paul Union Depot in June 1954.  In June 1962 the Great Northern transferred ownership of the engine to the Minnesota Historical Society, though the engine remained displayed in the depot.  The St. Paul Union Depot closed to passenger traffic in 1971; however, the engine was not removed until 1975, when it was moved to the newly established Lake Superior Railroad Museum in Duluth, Minnesota, where it remains.

 Legacy 
The William Crooks is one of only a few locomotives from the time of the Civil War that survive today. For the celebration of the 150th anniversary of rail service in Minnesota, the locomotive's whistle was blown for the first time since 1948, when it appeared at the Chicago Railroad Fair.

In 1959-1960 Marx Toy Company retailed, through Montgomery Ward, an electric toy train using the William Crooks locomotive design and freight express cars for their Tales of Wells Fargo play-set. In 1973 the train was reissued, as a Heritage play-set, The Pioneer Express, retailed through Sears & Roebuck, with the locomotive pulling the tender, an open lumber car and caboose.

 Images 

Works cited

 Wills Boosters, Hustlers and Speculators St. Paul MN Hist. Soc. 2005
 Chicago Railroad Fair Official Guide Book'' (1949).

References

External links

4-4-0 locomotives
Great Northern Railway (United States) locomotives
Individual locomotives of the United States
Passenger locomotives
Steam locomotives of the United States
Railway locomotives introduced in 1861
Passenger rail transportation in Minnesota
Tourist attractions in Duluth, Minnesota
Preserved steam locomotives of Minnesota